The Broken Key is a 2017 English-language Italian independent film written and directed by Louis Nero.

Cast
 Andrea Cocco as Arthur J. Adams
 Diana Dell'Erba as Sara Eve
 Marco Deambrogio as James Mind
 Christopher Lambert as Francis Rosebud
 Rutger Hauer as Professor Adrian Moonlight
 Geraldine Chaplin as Tower Woman
 Michael Madsen as Tully De Marco
 William Baldwin as Friar Hugo
 Kabir Bedi as Fahrid Al-Kamar
 Maria De Medeiros as Althea
 Franco Nero as Hiram Abif
 Marc Fiorini as Nicholas Macchiavelli
 Walter Lippa as Taron Iron
 Alex Belli as "Snake"
 Chiara Iezzi as Esther Star
 Ariadna Romero as Nora Segni
 Diego Casale as Frank Maro

Production
The film was shot in Italy, Cairo and York (UK). In Piedmont was shot in locations including: Sacra di San Michele, Saliceto, Piedmont, Rosazza, Caves of Bossea.

References

External links
 
 
 

English-language Italian films
2017 films
Films directed by Louis Nero
2010s English-language films
2010s Italian films